= San Julián Obispo, Burgos =

Church building in Burgos, Spain

Coordinates: 42°20′07″N 3°41′55″W

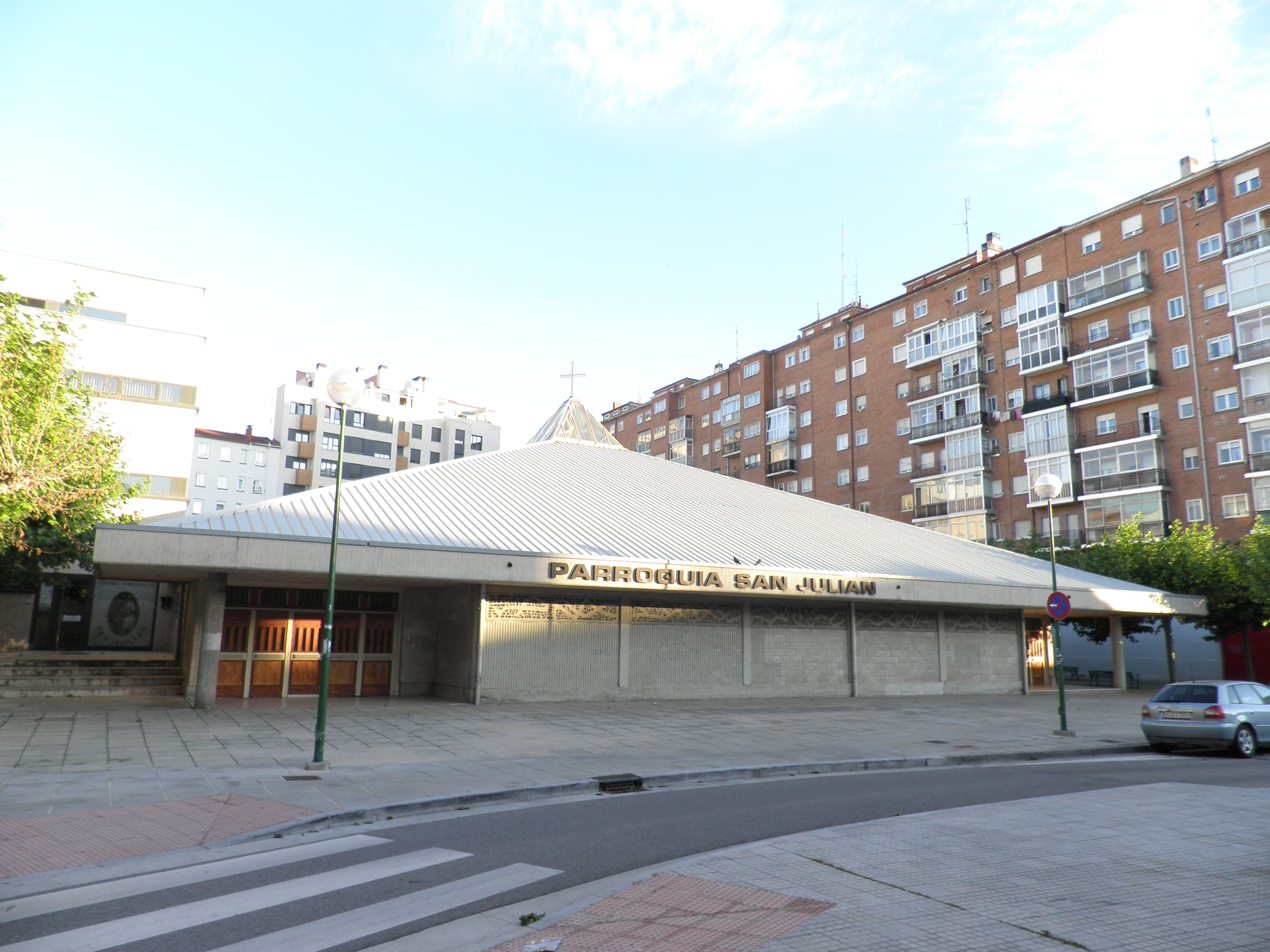

Iglesia de San Julián Obispo is a church in Burgos, Spain. It was built between November 1975 and September 1977 by the architects Pedro Gutiérrez Ruiz and Pedro Silleras Alonso Celada. The rectangular three naves are organized into five sections and the presbytery is one of the smaller sides. The central nave is higher and wider than the side and has a stained glass window, created to capture the most light possible. Building materials include reinforced concrete, solid brick and aluminum.
